Muhammad Sarwar Khan Kakar was a former politician and head of the Pashtun Kakar tribe in the Pakistani province of Balochistan. He was from the Barshore and Toba Kakar Ranges area of Pishin District. He was born in 1942 and studied at St. Michael's School, Quetta. His political career began in 1979, when he became the Chairman of Pishin District Council, serving in that role until 1984. From 1985 to 1999, he was elected five times to represent Pishin in the Provincial Assembly of Balochistan and served as the Speaker of the Assembly from 1985 to 1988. He was a Provincial Minister from 1990 to 1994 and 1998–1999, with various portfolios including education, finance, transport, excise and taxation, revenue, and sports. He was elected to the Senate of Pakistan in 2005 on a PML-Q ticket, and was the Chairman of the Senate Standing Committee on Local Government and Rural Areas. On 18 February 2008, Sarwar Khan was a candidate for elections to the National Assembly of Pakistan and the Provincial Assembly of Balochistan, winning a seat in the provincial election. However, before he could take up his seat in the provincial Assembly, he died on 21 February 2008 and his seat was given to his nephew Khan Asfandiyar Khan Kakar.He was left behind with 2 wives and 2 daughters.

References

1942 births
Living people
Members of the Senate of Pakistan
Pakistan Muslim League (Q) politicians
Pashtun people
People from Pishin District
Balochistan MPAs 1985–1988
Balochistan MPAs 1988–1990
Balochistan MPAs 1990–1993
Balochistan MPAs 1993–1996
Balochistan MPAs 1997–1999
Speakers of the Provincial Assembly of Balochistan